Burdur Province is a province of Turkey, located in the southwest and bordering Muğla and Antalya to the south, Denizli to the west, Afyon to the north, and Isparta to the east. It has an area of 6,887 km2 and a population of 258,868. The provincial capital is Burdur city.

Burdur is located in the Lakes Region of Turkey and has many lakes of various sizes, the largest of which, Burdur Lake, is named after the province. Salda Lake is the second largest lake in the province and is considered to be one of the cleanest lakes in the world.

Districts

Burdur province is divided into 11 districts (capital district in bold):
Ağlasun
Altınyayla
Bucak
Burdur
Çavdır
Çeltikçi
Gölhisar
Karamanlı
Kemer
Tefenni
Yeşilova

Gallery

See also
 List of populated places in Burdur Province

References

External links 

  Burdur governor's official website
  Burdur municipality's official website
  Burdur weather forecast information
  Burdur newspaper